Tanymastigidae is a family of fairy shrimp. It contains two genera:
 Tanymastigites (Brtek, 1972)
 Tanymastix (Simon, 1886)

References

External links

Anostraca
Crustacean families